St. James Parish is a parish located in the U.S. state of Louisiana. The parish seat is Convent. The parish was created in 1807. St. James Parish is a part of the New Orleans–Metairie, Louisiana metropolitan statistical area, sitting between New Orleans and Baton Rouge on the Mississippi River. According to the 2020 United States census, the population was 20,192.

It is perhaps best known for being located within Cancer Alley, and as the home base of Goldman Environmental Prize-winning environmental activist Sharon Lavigne.

History
St. James is one of the state's nineteen original parishes, created by act of the territorial legislature, March 31, 1807. The original seat of government was the community of St. James, on the west bank of the Mississippi, but this was moved in 1869 to what is now Convent, on the east bank.

St. James Parish is part of the Acadian Coast.  While it is possible that some Acadians did arrive prior to 1755 or between 1755 and 1764, the first documented group of Acadians [4 families: 20 individuals] arrived in New Orleans in February 1764. The arrival was documented in a letter dated April 6, 1764, from Governor D'Abbadie to his superior in France. They were settled along the Mississippi River in present-day St. James.

St. James is known for its tradition, Bonfires on the Levee, which takes place every Christmas Eve. Residents build large bonfires along the River levee, lighting them all at nightfall. The townsfolk tell the children that the purpose of this tradition is so Papa Noel can easily see his way down the Mississippi as he is delivering gifts.

St. James is the only cultivation site in the world for Perique tobacco, introduced by an Acadian exile, Pierre Chenet, whose nickname was "Perique." It has been produced by his descendants for nearly two centuries (now covering only a 300-acre (1.2 km2) tract) and is in great demand by large tobacco companies.

Geography
It is the fourth-smallest parish in Louisiana by land area and second-smallest by total area.

Major highways
  Interstate 10
  U.S. Highway 61
  Louisiana Highway 18
  Louisiana Highway 20
  Louisiana Highway 44
  Louisiana Highway 70 (Sunshine Bridge across Mississippi River)
  Louisiana Highway 3127
  Louisiana Highway 3213 (Gramercy Bridge across Mississippi River)

Adjacent parishes
 Ascension Parish  (north)
 St. John the Baptist Parish  (east)
 Lafourche Parish  (south)
 Assumption Parish  (west)

Communities

Towns 
 Gramercy
 Lutcher (largest town)

Census-designated places 

 Convent (parish seat)
 Grand Point
 Hester
 Lemannville
 Moonshine
 North Vacherie
 Paulina
 Romeville
 South Vacherie
 St. James
 Union
 Welcome

Other unincorporated community 
 Vacherie

Demographics

As of the 2020 United States census, there were 20,192 people, 7,719 households, and 5,732 families residing in the parish. Its racial and ethnic makeup in 2020 was 49.11% non-Hispanic white, 46.98% Black and African American, 0.145 Native American, 0.14% Asian, 1.93% other or mixed race, and 1.7% Hispanic or Latin American of any race. In 2019, the racial and ethnic makeup was 48.2% non-Hispanic white, 49.6% Black and African American, 0.2% Asian, 0.4% two or more races, and 1.7% Hispanic or Latin American of any race. At the 2010 census, the racial and ethnic composition of the parish was 50.6% Black or African American, 48.0% White, 0.2% Native American, 0.1% Asian, 0.4% of some other race and 0.7% of two or more races. 1.2% were Hispanic or Latin American (of any race). An estimated 15.2% of the parish were of French ancestry at the 2019 census estimates. In 2000, 93.78% of the population spoke only English at home, while 4.97% spoke French or Cajun French .

There were 7,719 households and 8,919 housing units in 2019, and the median household income was $51,603; the median housing value was $158,500 and the median rent was $644. From 2015 to 2019, the parish had a poverty rate of 17.0%. In 2000, the median income for a household in the parish was $35,277, and the median income for a family was $41,751. Males had a median income of $37,487 versus $21,712 for females. The per capita income for the parish was $14,381.  20.70% of the population and 18.00% of families were below the poverty line. Out of the total people living in poverty, 27.70% are under the age of 18 and 15.10% are 65 or older.

According to the Association of Religion Data Archives in 2020, the Roman Catholic Church dominated the parish, with Christianity being the area's predominant religion since colonization. Roman Catholics numbered 19,342 while the National Baptist Convention of the United States of America had 2,180 members. Non/inter-denominational Protestants among the congregationalist, Bible, and United and Uniting churches numbered 1,060.

Economy
Approximately 85% percent of reported air pollution in the parish is produced by industries located in primarily black census districts, Convent and Uncle Sam and the town of  St James. These include the Shell Convent Refinery, an Occidental Chemical Factory, American Styrenics, and Mosaic Fertilizer.

Formosa Plastic Group plans to build a $9.4 billion petrochemical plant in the parish. The plant's property includes a grave of enslaved people, and is being built on the site of a plantation. The site has become a site of environmental justice protest for both the lack of addressing the historical relationship to the land and due to the expected rise in pollution due to the plant.

Education
St. James Parish Public Schools serves all of St. James Parish.

Politics
The current parish president is Peter “Pete” Dufresne (D), who took office at the beginning of 2020. In 2016, his predecessor Timmy Roussel was indicted on corruption charges, when he was accused of having parish employees build a private natural gas line.

St. James Parish is strongly Democratic, although in 2016 Donald Trump came within ten percent of carrying the parish, and Trump was within five percent vs. Joe Biden in 2020. The last Republican to win a majority of the parish's vote was Warren G. Harding in 1920, when Louisiana's Acadian population revolted against Woodrow Wilson because of his bitter disagreement with French President Georges Clemenceau. Dwight D. Eisenhower won a 17-vote plurality in 1956, and Richard Nixon also won a plurality in his 2,900-plus-county 1972 landslide.

See also

 National Register of Historic Places listings in St. James Parish, Louisiana
 Acadian Coast
 German Coast
 River Parishes
 Perique
 George T. Oubre

References

External links

 St. James Parish government's website
 St. James High School Wildcats
 Explore the History and Culture of Southeastern Louisiana, a National Park Service Discover Our Shared Heritage Travel Itinerary
 St. James Paris Sheriff's Office

Geology
 McCulloh, R. P., P. V. Heinrich, and J. Snead, 2003, Ponchatoula 30 x 60 minute geologic quadrangle. Louisiana Geological Survey, Baton Rouge, Louisiana.

 
Louisiana parishes
New Orleans metropolitan area
Acadiana
Louisiana parishes on the Mississippi River
1807 establishments in the Territory of Orleans
Populated places established in 1807
Majority-minority parishes in Louisiana